The Team free routine competition of the 2022 European Aquatics Championships will be held on 13 and 15 August 2022.

Results
The preliminary round was held on 13 August at 09:30.The final round was held on 15 August at 15:00.

References

Artistic